The following is a list of footballers who have represented Saint Pierre and Miquelon in senior international matches.

Key

Players 
List is incomplete as of 15 March 2020.

References

Saint Pierre and Miquelon
Association football player non-biographical articles